El Peñol is a town and municipality in the Nariño Department, Colombia.

Municipalities of Nariño Department